Melithaea philippinensis is a coral, a member of octocorals in the family Melithaeidae. it is native the Philippine islands it was discovered by the H.M.S. Challenger during the years 1873–76 on a Zoology expedition.

References 

Fauna of the Philippines
Melithaeidae